Natale in Sudafrica is a 2010 Italian comedy film directed by Neri Parenti.

Cast
Christian De Sica as Carlo Boffa
Belén Rodríguez as Angela Ladesse
Giorgio Panariello as Ligabue Della Chianina
Massimo Ghini as Massimo Rischio
Laura Esquivel as Laura Rischio
Max Tortora as Giorgio Boffa
Serena Autieri as Marta Boffa
Barbara Tabita as Susanna Boffa
Brenno Placido as Mauro
Alessandro Cacelli as Vitellozzo Della Chianina

See also
 List of Christmas films

References

External links

2010 films
Films directed by Neri Parenti
Films scored by Bruno Zambrini
Films set in South Africa
2010s Italian-language films
2010 comedy films
2010s Christmas comedy films
Italian Christmas comedy films